Shaka Zulu is a 1987 album by South African a cappella group Ladysmith Black Mambazo.

History
Following the collaboration on Paul Simon's 1986 album Graceland which brought the group to international prominence, Shaka Zulu (produced by Simon) marked the band's first genuine international hit, securing them an American audience which would be built upon by the successes of Journey of Dreams (1988) and Two Worlds, One Heart (1990). Shaka Zulu was a collection of newly recorded versions of older Mambazo hits, such as "Unomathemba", "Hello My Baby" and "Lomhlaba Kawunoni".

Shaka Zulu won a Grammy in 1988 for Best Traditional Folk Recording.

The album was also featured in Robert Dimery's 2006 musical reference book 1001 Albums You Must Hear Before You Die.

Reception
In his consumer guide for The Village Voice, Robert Christgau felt the album had a "generalized gospel yearning", and a lyric sheet and songs in English that would appeal to Americans.

In a retrospective review for Allmusic, William Ruhlmann felt the album was "pristinely recorded" and is the band's most accessible album.

Track listing
All songs composed by Joseph Shabalala and produced by Paul Simon
"Unomathemba" - 3:47
"Hello My Baby" - 3:09
"Golgotha" - 3:57
"King of Kings" - 4:07
"Lomhlaba Kawunoni" - 2:55
"How Long?" - 3:05
"Ikhaya Lamaqhawe" - 3:13
"Yibo Labo" - 4:39
"Rain, Rain Beautiful Rain" - 2:18
"Wawusho Kubani?" - 5:31

Charts

References

External links

Shaka Zulu  (Adobe Flash) at Radio3Net (streamed copy where licensed)

Ladysmith Black Mambazo albums
1987 albums
Cultural depictions of Shaka